Lookout Dome is an ice-covered, dome-shaped mountain,  high, in the Miller Range, Antarctica. It was so named by the New Zealand Geological Survey Antarctic Expedition (1961–62) because its heights offer an extensive view of Nimrod Glacier and were used as a survey station.

References

Mountains of Oates Land